Suzanne Wolff  ( Stoddart; born 6 December 1982) is a British former professional racing driver and current managing director of F1 Academy.

Her parents, John and Sally Stoddart, owned a motorcycle dealership in Oban and her father raced bikes competitively. She progressed through the ranks of motorsport, starting off in karting, before graduating to Formula Renault and Formula Three, then moving to the Deutsche Tourenwagen Masters (DTM) to compete for Mercedes-Benz. In 2012, she was signed by Williams in Formula One to work as a development driver and made history at the 2014 British Grand Prix at Silverstone, becoming the first woman to take part in a Formula One race weekend in 22 years. On 4 November 2015, Wolff announced her retirement from motorsport, last competing at the Race of Champions held at the end of November. In 2016, Wolff joined Channel 4 in the UK to be an analyst for their Formula One coverage. 

In 2018, she joined Venturi Racing in Formula E as Team Principal. In 2021, she was promoted to the role of CEO. In August 2022 following the Season 8 finale in South Korea, she announced her departure from Venturi and Formula E.

Personal life 
Wolff's parents met when her mother bought her first motorbike from her father's shop, who used to race bikes. Wolff has an older brother David, 18 months her senior. 

As toddlers, both she and her brother were put on skis and bikes by her parents, with the open spaces of Oban being suited to biking and go-karting. She realised the potential she had to be a racing driver when taken to watch her first Formula 3 race at 13. 

She went on to study international business at Edinburgh university, but left after a year. A week after leaving, she went to Silverstone to drive for Formula Renault. 

In 2005, Wolff broke her ankle running, which along with financial issues prevented her from competing in Formula Three.

She met her future husband Toto Wolff, who was on the Williams team, whilst in a 7 year contract from Mercedes-Benz, which started in 2006 due to being noticed from being nominated as Britain's Young Driver of the Year Award twice. She was made to drive a pink car at Mercedes, which she claims made her life more difficult due to the attitudes of her teammates. Wolff married in Capri in 2011. When she moved to the Williams team, her husband Toto Wolff moved to Mercedes.

In 2017, she gave birth to her son, Jack. 

She currently lives in Monaco with her husband.

Career

Early years
Wolff began competing at karting at the early age of eight, and in 1996 she was named the British Woman Kart Racing Driver of the year. In 1997, she competed in a number of different karting categories and succeeded in most. She was first in the 24hr Middle East Kart Championship, champion in both the Scottish Junior Intercontinental "A" and the Scottish Open Junior Intercontinental "A" categories and was again named British Woman Kart Racing Driver of the year.

In 1998, she moved up to the British Junior Intercontinental "A" Championship and was placed 10th overall in her first season in the class. She also competed in the Federation Cup European Intercontinental "A" Championship and placed 11th overall. For the third consecutive season, she was named British Woman Kart Racing Driver of the year.

The following year, she competed in the British Formula "A" Championship and was placed 13th, also achieving 34th overall in the Formula "A" World Championships to receive the accolade of British Woman Kart Racing Driver of the year for a fourth time. 

In 2000, Wolff improved on her previous performances to take 10th in British Formula “A” and 15th in the Formula “A” World Championships, later winning an award which named her as the Top Female Kart Driver in the world.

Formula Renault (2001–04)
In 2001, Wolff graduated from kart racing to single-seater racing, gaining her first experience in the Formula Renault Winter Series, in which she competed for the Motaworld Racing team. The following year she made her debut in the full Formula Renault UK Championship for DFR Racing while again representing Motaworld in the Formula Renault Winter Series.

In the 2003 season, Wolff finished ninth overall in the Formula Renault UK Championship and secured her maiden podium finish, achieving recognition for her efforts as one of the finalists in the prestigious BRDC McLaren Autosport Young Driver of the Year Award. Wolff was also selected as the BRDC Rising Star of the Year.

For her third season in the Formula Renault UK Championship in 2004, Wolff raced for Comtec Racing and finished fifth overall in the final standings, taking three podium finishes and points in 19 of the season’s 20 races.

Formula Three (2005)
For 2005, Wolff advanced to the British Formula 3 Championship to compete for Alan Docking Racing in the Championship Class. Her season was disrupted by an ankle injury sustained during the winter. Wolff also made a one-off appearance in the Porsche Carrera Cup GB at Brands Hatch in June.

DTM (2006–12)
In 2006, Wolff stepped up to compete in the DTM. Racing for Mücke Motorsport, she drove a 2004-spec Mercedes-Benz C-Class Coupe and achieved a best finish of ninth overall in the final round at the Hockenheimring to complete her debut season.

Remaining in the DTM for 2007, again driving for Mücke Motorsport, Wolff recorded her best result at Mugello in Italy, where she finished in 10th place. At the end of the season, she left Mücke Motorsport to join Persson Motorsport for the 2008 season.

Moving up to a 2007-specification car, Wolff recorded her best performance of 2008 in June’s race at the Norisring in which she finished 10th – a result she equalled in 2009 on two occasions again at the Norisring and Oschersleben.

2010 showcased Wolff’s best season in the DTM and her third with Persson Motorsport. Taking a seventh-placed finish at Lausitz, she again matched this performance at the Hockenheimring to conclude the season with four points and 13th in the Drivers’ Championship.

Wolff continued to race in the DTM for a further two years Persson Motorsport and announced her departure from the series ahead of the 2012 finale at the Hockenheimring, ending her seven-season tenure to focus solely on her testing duties with Williams in Formula One.

Formula One

Williams (2012–15)
On 11 April 2012, Wolff was named as a development driver for the Williams Formula One team. In 2014, Williams announced that Wolff would be driving in two free practice sessions at the British and German Grand Prix. At the British Grand Prix at Silverstone, Wolff became the first woman to participate in a Formula One weekend since 1992, when Giovanna Amati made three unsuccessful Grand Prix qualification attempts. 

Wolff’s time on the track was cut short after an engine problem occurred after completing just one timed lap. On 18 July 2014, Wolff drove in a free practice session at the German Grand Prix which also started with car problems. These issues were solved and Wolff put in a good performance, finishing the session in 15th place out of 22 cars with a time of 1:20.769, just two-tenths of a second behind team-mate Felipe Massa’s 11th-placed 1:20.542 time.

On 28 November 2014, Williams announced that Wolff would stay with the team for the 2015 season in an enhanced role as test driver, with her position expanded to include two Friday practice runs and two test outings. After driving in Formula One pre-season testing, Wolff clocked a 1:29.708 lap in the first practice session of the Spanish Grand Prix and returned to the cockpit in practice for the British Grand Prix, posting a 1:37.242 for a respectable 13th place out of 20 cars.

On 4 November 2015, Wolff announced on the BBC that she was retiring from Formula One, stating that she felt that she had gone as far as she could go, but expressed intentions to help other women in motorsport. Wolff stated that she would compete for one final time in the 2015 Race of Champions at the end of November, representing Scotland alongside former Formula One driver David Coulthard, before subsequently retiring from all forms of motorsport.

Mercedes (2016–)
Wolff joined Mercedes as one of their ambassadors in 2016, and as part of the role was one of the first to test the Mercedes-AMG One.

Formula E (2018–2022)
In 2018, Wolff joined Venturi Racing in Formula E as Team Principal and also became a shareholder in the team.

For the 2019–20 season, Venturi entered into a powertrain partnership with Mercedes-EQ.

Under Wolff’s management, the Monegasque outfit experienced its most successful campaign to date in the 2020–21 season, recording 146 points with Edoardo Mortara securing second in the Drivers' World Championship, falling only seven points adrift of winner Nyck de Vries.

In November 2021 she was promoted to the role of CEO, with Jérôme d'Ambrosio becoming Team Principal for the 2021–22 season. In August 2022, she announced that she would leave Venturi in light of the team's plans to rebrand as Maserati MSG Racing from the 2022–23 season.

F1 Academy (2023–) 
On 1 March 2023, Wolff was appointed managing director of the newly launched all-female racing series, F1 Academy.

Race of Champions
The Race of Champions planned to feature a female driver for the first time in its history when Wolff signed up for ROC 2013, to be held at Bangkok's Rajamangala Stadium on 14–15 December. The news was warmly welcomed by ROC co-founder Michèle Mouton, the world's most successful female rally driver. However, in early December 2013, the event was cancelled due to the political situation in Bangkok.

In the 2014 event in Barbados, the Wolff–Coulthard pair was able to compete as Team United Kingdom. The pair reached the finals of the Nations' Cup but lost to Team Nordic. Wolff lost to Tom Kristensen in the Audi R8 LMS Ultra while Coulthard won against Petter Solberg in the VW Polo RX, but lost the tie-breaker to Kristensen in the Ariel Atom Cup. In the Drivers' Cup, Wolff was eliminated in the group stage.

The 2015 Race of Champions was held at the Olympic Stadium in London and Wolff again partnered David Coulthard to represent Team Scotland. In the Nation’s Cup, the pair failed to progress to the semi-finals, eliminated by Team England 2. Driving the Mercedes-AMG GT S, Wolff lost to Alex Buncombe while Coulthard was defeated by Jenson Button in the KTM X-Bow. Racing against team-mate Coulthard, Wolff was eliminated in Round 1 of the Drivers’ Cup to conclude her professional career in motorsport, retiring at the end of the 2015 season.

Dare To Be Different 
Following her retirement from motorsport, Wolff co-founded Dare to be Different alongside Motor Sports Association CEO Rob Jones. Officially launched at the Autosport International show held at the National Exhibition Centre in Birmingham on 14 January 2016, the nonprofit organisation aims to increase the participation of women in motorsport. 

Holding events across the United Kingdom, the initiative invites school girls between the ages of eight and 14 to participate in motor racing-related activities. Dare to be Different has a range of ambassadors including former Williams Formula One Deputy Team Principal Claire Williams, Sky Sports News and Sky Sports F1 presenter Rachel Brookes, and racing driver Tatiana Calderón.

In February 2019, Dare to be Different united with the FIA Girls on Track initiative to reach a wider audience, raising awareness to the opportunities for girls in motorsport. The first joint FIA Girls on Track - Dare to be Different event was held at the 2019 Mexico City ePrix at the Autódromo Hermanos Rodríguez.

Awards
On 8 October 2013, Wolff was awarded an Honorary Fellowship at the University of Edinburgh "in recognition of her role as an ambassador for women in sport". She had interrupted her studies at Edinburgh's Business School in 2001 in order to turn professional. Wolff was honoured as a Member of the Order of the British Empire (MBE) on the 2017 New Year Honours list for services to Women in Sport.

Racing record

Career summary

Complete Deutsche Tourenwagen Masters results
(key) (Races in bold indicate pole position) (Races in italics indicate fastest lap)

† — Retired, but was classified as she completed 90 per cent of the winner's race distance.

Complete Formula One participations
(key) (Races in bold indicate pole position) (Races in italics indicates fastest lap)

References

External links

1982 births
Living people
People from Oban
People educated at Oban High School
Scottish expatriate sportspeople in Switzerland
Scottish racing drivers
Scottish female racing drivers
Karting World Championship drivers
British Formula Renault 2.0 drivers
British Formula Three Championship drivers
Deutsche Tourenwagen Masters drivers
Members of the Order of the British Empire
Porsche Carrera Cup GB drivers
Alumni of the University of Edinburgh
Sportspeople from Argyll and Bute
Motaworld Racing drivers
Comtec Racing drivers
Alan Docking Racing drivers
Mücke Motorsport drivers
Mercedes-AMG Motorsport drivers